Ravil Fatekovich Umyarov (born 9 January 1962) is a Russian professional football coach and a former player. He works as a coach for youth teams of FC Tyumen.

Club career
He made his debut in the Soviet Second League in 1982 for FC Fakel Tyumen.

References

1962 births
Footballers from Moscow
Living people
Soviet footballers
Russian footballers
Association football forwards
FC Tyumen players
Russian Premier League players
Russian football managers
FC Tyumen managers